2B is a 2009 science fiction film directed by Richard Kroehling and starring James Remar, Kevin Corrigan, Jane Kim, and Hayley DuMond. It is based on the ideas of transhumanism and the technological singularity. The film was released on October 2, 2009 at the Woodstock Film Festival. It was produced in conjunction with Terasem Media and Films.

Plot
Set in the near future, 2B portrays a familiar decaying world on the cusp of "great transformation and awesome wonders". The story is based upon real science and evolving technologies. When the world's first transhuman is created by a renegade corporate CEO and bioscientist, the foundations of society's beliefs are threatened in a transhuman world where man merges with technology.

References

External links
 
 

2009 films
American science fiction films
2009 science fiction films
Transhumanism in film
2000s English-language films
2000s American films
English-language science fiction films